BACS is the Bankers Automated Clearing Services, a scheme for the electronic processing of financial transactions.

BACS or Bács may also refer to:

Organisations
 Bay Area Christian School, in League City, Texas, US
 Boston Archdiocesan Choir School, in Cambridge, Massachusetts, US
 British Association of Canadian Studies, a group for scholarly studies of Canadian culture

Other uses
 Bács (given name)
 Bács-Bodrog County, a county in the Habsburg Kingdom of Hungary from the 18th century to 1918
 Bács-Kiskun County, a county in Hungary, created from Bács-Bodrog and Pest-Pilis-Solt-Kiskun counties after World War II
 Bač, Serbia or Bács
 Bacterial artificial chromosomes, a DNA construct

See also

 Bacsik, a surname (including a list of people with the name)
 BAC (disambiguation)
 BASC (disambiguation)